Arctia flavia, the yellow tiger moth, is a moth of the family Erebidae. The species was first described by Johann Kaspar Füssli in 1779. It is found in the Alps above the tree level. It also occurs in Balkan mountains (Rila), European Russia, northern Kazakhstan, Siberia, Mongolia, north-eastern China, and Korea.

The wingspan is 50–70 mm. The moth flies July to August.

The larvae feed on a wide range of plants.

External links
Moths and Butterflies of Europe and North Africa
Fauna Europaea
Lepiforum e.V.

Arctiina
Moths of Europe
Moths of Asia
Moths described in 1779
Taxa named by Johann Kaspar Füssli